The Vancouver Cherry Blossom Festival is the city’s signature springtime event and an annual celebration of cherry blossoms inspired by the age-old Japanese cultural tradition of hanami (flower viewing). 

Our mantra, “there is no stranger under the cherry tree,” welcomes inclusion, participation and celebration of all community groups. Through our community-building events, we want to make the arts accessible and representative of all people across all backgrounds. For the few weeks the cherry blossoms are in bloom, we strive to be united as one community where our shared connection to nature means we are all connected.

History

The Vancouver Cherry Blossom Festival was founded in 2005 by Linda Poole, its executive director, to commemorate the 800 cherry trees given by Japan to the City of Vancouver.

The 15th annual Vancouver Cherry Blossom Festival ran virtually from 1–25 April 2021. 2020 saw the festival go on hiatus.

Events

The Festival has a roster of events that are put on every year. This year, virtually, the Festival will be featuring:
 Haiku Invitational
 Sakura Night
 Plein-Air Blossom Painting
 Cherry Jam Downtown Concert
 Sakura Illumination
 Kite Dance
 Cherry Blossom Picnics
 Sakura Days Japan Fair
 Blossom Bollywood and Kite Dance
 Bike the Blossom
 Tree Talks and Walks
 BC Blossom Watch Photo Contest

For more information, please visit their official website.

References

External links
Official website
Official Facebook page
A Guide to Vancouver's Cherry Blossoms from Tourism Vancouver
Vancouver Haiku Stone Photographs
Article from CBC Kids (March 31, 2014)
Article from CNN.com (March 5, 2012)
Article from BC Living (April 4, 2011)

Festivals in Vancouver
Spring festivals
Flower festivals in Canada
Cherry blossom festivals